Muhammad Izzdin Shafiq bin Yacob  (born 14 December 1990) is a Singaporean professional footballer who plays for Singapore Premier League club Geylang International FC. He played for the Singapore Selection XI at the 2015 Premier League Asia Trophy.

Izzdin is considered one of the top 5 players during Matchday 6 in the AFC Asian Cup 2018 in an article by FOX Sports Asia.

Club career

Young Lions
Izzdin began his professional football career with Under-23 side Young Lions in the S.League in 2009.

LionsXII
In December 2011, the FAS announced that Izzdin was to join the newly formed LionsXII for the 2012 Malaysia Super League.

Home United
The following year, in 2013, Izzdin left the LionsXII and signed for Home United for the 2013 S.League campaign.

LionsXII(2014-2015)
It was then announced that Izzdin would return to LionsXII for 2014 and 2015 Malaysia Super League. However, after the 2015 campaign, the club was disbanded.

Tampines Rovers
After the disbandment, Izzdin signed for Tampines Rovers in 2016.

Home United
Izzdin then signed for Home United for the 2017 S.League season.

Career statistics 
As at 10 Oct 2021

References

External links
 

Singapore international footballers
Singaporean footballers
1990 births
Living people
Young Lions FC players
LionsXII players
Home United FC players
Footballers at the 2010 Asian Games
Association football midfielders
Asian Games competitors for Singapore
Lion City Sailors FC players
Southeast Asian Games medalists in football
Southeast Asian Games bronze medalists for Singapore
Competitors at the 2013 Southeast Asian Games